Million is an unincorporated community in Madison County, Kentucky. It is located at the junction of Kentucky Route 169 and Kentucky Route 1984.

History
A post office called Million was established in 1884, and remained in operation until 1945.
 The origin of the name "Million" is obscure.

References

Unincorporated communities in Madison County, Kentucky
Unincorporated communities in Kentucky